The market-oriented sector selective talks (MOSS) were held between the United States and Japan in 1984. Topic were trade frictions on four product areas: forest products, telecommunications equipment and services, electronics, and pharmaceuticals and medical equipment. The talks were aimed at routing out all overt and informal barriers to imports in these areas, especially on the Japanese side. The negotiations lasted throughout 1985 and achieved modest success.

See also
Japan–United States relations
Economic relations of Japan
General Agreement on Tariffs and Trade

1984 in the United States
1984 in Japan
Japan–United States relations
Foreign trade of Japan
Foreign trade of the United States